Greased Lightnin', or Greased Lightning, may refer to:

Arts, media, and entertainment

Films 

 Greased Lightning, a 1977 biographical film directed by Michael Schultz
 Greased Lightning (1919 film), a silent comedy film directed by Jerome Storm
 Greased Lightning (1928 film), an American Western film directed by Ray Taylor

Music 
 "Greased Lightnin'" (song), a song from the musical Grease

Other uses 
 Greezed Lightnin' or Greased Lightnin', three separate installations of the Shuttle Loop roller coaster